Alicja Jadwiga Kotowska (Warsaw – 11 November 1939, near Wielka Piaśnica) was a Polish religious sister who was head of the Resurrectionist convent in Wejherowo between 1934 and 1939. She was arrested by the Gestapo on 24 October 1939 during prayer and murdered alongside over 300 other Poles and Jews on 11 November in one of the Piaśnica massacres. Witnesses reported seeing her comfort Jewish children while being transported. She was beatified by the Roman Catholic Church in 1999 as one of the 108 Martyrs of World War II.

Life 
Kotowska was born on 20 November 1899 to a devout Catholic family, the second of eight children. During World War I she worked as a nurse. She took her vows on 2 February 1924, but continued her academic studies in addition to her duties, earning a Masters degree in chemistry in 1929. She later worked as a teacher and headmistress of a school.

Death 
She was arrested by the Gestapo on 24 October 1939 during prayer and murdered alongside over 300 other Poles and Jews on 11 November in one of the Piaśnica massacres. Witnesses reported seeing her comfort Jewish children while being transported.

References

Bibliography 
 .
 .
 .

1899 births
1939 deaths
Polish people executed by Nazi Germany
108 Blessed Polish Martyrs
Catholic resistance to Nazi Germany
Polish civilians killed in World War II
Nuns from Warsaw
Executed people from Masovian Voivodeship
20th-century Polish Roman Catholic nuns